The 2017 Esiliiga is the 27th season of the Esiliiga, second-highest Estonian league for association football clubs, since its establishment in 1992. The season began on 2 March 2017.

Teams
A total of 10 teams are contesting the league, including 6 sides from the 2016 season, one relegated from the 2016 Meistriliiga and three promoted from the 2016 Esiliiga B.

Stadia

Personnel and kits

Managerial changes

Results

League table

Result tables

First half of the season

Second half of the season

Season statistics

Top scorers

Awards

Monthly awards

Esiliiga Player of the Year
Vitali Gussev was named Esiliiga Player of the Year.

See also
 2016–17 Estonian Cup
 2017–18 Estonian Cup
 2017 Meistriliiga
 2017 Esiliiga B

References

External links
Official website

Esiliiga seasons
2
Estonia
Estonia